Percavirus is a genus of viruses in the order Herpesvirales, in the family Herpesviridae, in the subfamily Gammaherpesvirinae. Mammals serve as natural hosts. There are six species in this genus. Diseases associated with this genus include: conjunctivitis, immunosuppression in foals, pneumonia, respiratory disease.

Species
The genus consists of the following six species:

 Equid gammaherpesvirus 2
 Equid gammaherpesvirus 5
 Felid gammaherpesvirus 1
 Mustelid gammaherpesvirus 1
 Phocid gammaherpesvirus 3
 Vespertilionid gammaherpesvirus 1

Structure 
Viruses in Percavirus are enveloped, with icosahedral, spherical to pleomorphic, and round geometries, and T=16 symmetry. The diameter is around 150-200 nm. Genomes are linear and non-segmented, around 180kb in length.

Life cycle 
Viral replication is nuclear, and is lysogenic. Entry into the host cell is achieved by attachment of the viral glycoproteins to host receptors, which mediates endocytosis. Replication follows the dsDNA bidirectional replication model. DNA-templated transcription, with some alternative splicing mechanism is the method of transcription. The virus exits the host cell by nuclear egress, and  budding.
Mammals serve as the natural host.

References

External links 

 Viralzone: Percavirus
 ICTV

Herpesviridae
Virus genera